Parampara is an Indian Telugu-language crime drama streaming television series, starring Jagapathi Babu, Sarath Kumar, Naveen Chandra, Ishaan and Aakanksha Singh in the lead roles. The series premiered on Disney+ Hotstar on 24 December 2021. Season 2 of the series premiered on 21 July 2022.

And the budget is 1 crore per season estimated

Premise

Season 1

Cast 

 Jagapathi Babu as Chintalapudi Mohana Rao Naidu
 Sritej as Young Mohan Rao 
 Sarath Kumar as Chintalapudi Nagendra Naidu
 Prawin Yendamuri as Young Naidu
 Naveen Chandra as Chintalapudi Gopi Naidu
 Ishan as Chintalapudi Suresh Naidu
 Aakanksha Singh as Rachana
 Naina Ganguly as Jenny
 Aamani as Bhanumati
 Kasthuri as Indira 
 Murali Mohan as Chintalapudi Veera Naidu
 Thotapalli Madhu as Gangaraju
 Surya Bhagvandas as Bharani
 Jogi Brothers as Theepi Seenu & Pulupu Seenu
 Arjun Ambati as Harsha
 Kedar Shankar as Krishna Prasad
 Kamalakar as Upendra
 Teja as SP Parasuram
 Praveena as Kamala
 Shreya Navile as Aruna
 Rama Devi as Yamuna
Season 2
 Mayank Parakh as Omar
 Divi Vadthya as Tara

Episodes

Season 1 (2021)

Season 2 (2022)

Production 
In December 2020, it was reported that Kannada actor Ishaan was cast in a leading role alongside Sarath Kumar. In August 2021, it was revealed that Jagapathi Babu, Naveen Chandra and Aakanksha Singh were cast in lead roles. The series was initially titled Gharshana but was later renamed as Parampara.

Release 
Parampara was premiered on Disney+ Hotstar on December 24, 2021. The series is renewed for a new season in June 2022. The second season will premiere on 21 July 2022.

Promotion 
In December 2021, the character teasers of the show were released by Disney+ Hotstar. The official trailer for the series was premiered on 15 December 2021.

Reception

Season 1 
Thadhagath Pathi writing for The Times of India, stated that Parampara tries to depict the family factions with detailed and intense characters, with directors Krishna Vijay and deserving credit for the same. No two characters show hate towards each other but everyone is aware of their true feelings, and that’s a win for this privileged family drama and rated 2.5 out of 5.

Season 2 
Citing it as "a racier follow-up" Sangeetha Devi Dundoo of The Hindu wrote that "The twists and turns in Parampara are staple tropes of mainstream cinema. A long-form series can lend itself to newer and more intriguing subplots rather than offering more of the same, predictable storylines". 

Arvind V of Pinkvilla gave a rating of 2 out of 5 and praised the performances of Chandra and Sarathkumar. Echoing the same, 123Telugu gave a rating of 2.75 out of 5 and stated: "Parampara S2 has scope for good drama and engaging screenplay but is brought down by uneven sequences. The writing needs to be blamed for making it underwhelming".

Paul Nicodemus of The Times of India gave 2.5 out of 5 stars and wrote "Parampara Season 2 has swag, emotion and action but unnecessarily gets undone by overbearing ‘indebted’ rhetoric."

Satya Pulagam writing for ABP News stated "The second season seems to be better than the first season, there are some interesting political and family moments and drama."

References

External links

Telugu-language web series
Telugu-language Disney+ Hotstar original programming
Indian drama television series
Indian crime television series
Indian drama web series
2021 web series debuts
2022 Indian television seasons
2021 Indian television series debuts
2021 Indian television seasons